Oren Nisim (born 4 November 1976) is a retired Israeli footballer.  Nissim is mostly known for being a part of Hapoel Haifa when they won their first and only Israeli league championship in 1999. Nissim was known for his strength and height, which helped him score many goals.

He is of a Tunisian-Jewish descent.

Honours
Israeli Premier League (1):
1998–99
Toto Cup (1):
2000–01
Toto Cup (Leumit) (3):
2004–05, 2008–09, 2010
Liga Leumit (2):
2010-11, 2011–12
Liga Leumit - Top Goalscorer:
2004-05 (15 goals), 2010-11 (18 goals)
Liga Alef (1):
2013-14

References

External links

Stats at ONE

1976 births
Living people
Israeli footballers
Hapoel Tzafririm Holon F.C. players
Hapoel Haifa F.C. players
Bnei Yehuda Tel Aviv F.C. players
F.C. Ashdod players
Maccabi Ahi Nazareth F.C. players
Maccabi Netanya F.C. players
Hapoel Kfar Saba F.C. players
Hapoel Be'er Sheva F.C. players
Hapoel Nir Ramat HaSharon F.C. players
Hapoel Ramat Gan F.C. players
Maccabi Yavne F.C. players
Liga Leumit players
Israeli Premier League players
Footballers from Holon
Israeli people of Tunisian-Jewish descent
Association football forwards